A drill is a tool or machine for cutting holes in a material.

Drill may also refer to:

Animals
 Drill (animal), a type of African primate
 Oyster drill, a type of snail

Military
 Military exercise
 Foot drill, the movements performed on a military parade
 Former name of the United States Army Reserve's Battle Assembly
 Exhibition drill, a form of complex military drill
 Drill commands
 When applied as an adjective, a practice version of something, e.g., drill round

Music
 Drill music, a subgenre of trap music

Performers
 Drill (band), an alternative rock band
 Drill (UK band), an industrial rock band from England 
 The Drill (band), an electro house band

Recordings
 Drill (album), a 1996 album by the band of the same name
 Drill (EP), a 1992 EP by Radiohead
 The Drill (album), a 1991 album by Wire
 Drill, a 1996 album by Noise Unit
 "Drill", a 2021 song by G Herbo from the album 25

Safety exercises
 Fire drill
 Tornado drill
 Lockdown drill

Technology
 Bow drill, a fire-making tool
 Drill (agriculture), an agricultural tool
 Drill (fabric), a type of cotton fabric
 Data drilling, navigation through levels of a hierarchy in data analysis
 Apache Drill, a distributed query engine

Other uses
 Drill, Virginia, a community in the United States
 Dan Drill, University of Minnesota student charged with a violent rape
 Lew Drill (1877–1969), American baseball player, baseball manager, and lawyer

See also
 Drilling (disambiguation)
 DRIL (disambiguation)
 Bore (disambiguation)